The Asian Clearing Union (ACU) was established on December 9, 1974, at the initiative of the United Nations Economic and Social Commission for Asia and the Pacific (ESCAP). The primary objective of ACU, at the time of its establishment, was to secure regional co-operation regarding the clearing of eligible monetary transactions among the members of the Union to provide a system for clearing payments among the member countries on a multilateral basis.

Objectives

 To facilitate settlement of payments on a multilateral basis,
 To promote the use of participants' currencies, 
 To promote monetary co-operation among the participants, 
 To provide for currency swap arrangement among the participants.

Settlement Process
Period: Bimonthly Settlement

Payment Deadline: T+4

Currency Swap Arrangements

Eligibility: Any participant in net deficit

Time of request: Before the end of a settlement period

Amount: 20% of the average gross payments (ACU dollar/euro/yen accounts collectively) made by every eligible participant

Rate: linear interpolation of Chicago Mercantile Exchange: CME SOFR one month and three month for US Dollar, the EURIBOR two month for Euro, two month LIBOR declared by the ICE for Japanese Yen

Benefits:
 Easy access to international reserves of other participants
 Availability of the facility on a multilateral basis
 The opportunity for further monetary co-operation

Units of Accounts

AMU: Asian Monetary Units (viz. ACU dollar, ACU euro, and ACU yen),
 
The AMUs are denominated as ACU dollar, ACU euro, and ACU yen which are equivalent in value to 1 USD, 1 Euro, and 1 JPY, respectively.

Interest
 Payable by the net debtors at the end of each settlement period,
 Calculated on the daily outstanding between settlement dates,
 Interest rate will be the closing rate on the last Monday of the previous calendar month offered by Chicago Mercantile Exchange Secured Overnight Financing Rate (CME SOFR) term one month for US Dollar, the Euro Interbank Offered Rate (EURIBOR) one month for Euro, and the Inter-Continental Exchange (ICE) for one month Japanese Yen deposits

Exchange Rate
The SDR cross-rates which are quoted by the IMF on a daily basis are applied as a reference rate.

Benefits of Becoming a Member
 Saving Forex reserves through multilateral netting and bi-monthly settlement,
 Addressing trade imbalances and expanding of trade and monetary cooperation between members,
 No need to accumulate the currencies of other members,
 Access to new markets and monetary integration and financial deepening,
 Possibility of using USD, EUR, and JPY as reserve currencies,
 No membership fee,
 Higher clearing efficiency,

Contact
website: www.asianclearingunion.org

Members
Currently (2022), the members of ACU are the central banks of Bangladesh, Bhutan, Iran (not active owing to international banking sanctions), India, Maldives, Nepal, Pakistan, Sri Lanka, and Myanmar. The central banking authorities of member countries have issued detailed instructions and modalities for channeling the monetary transactions through the ACU. Membership in the ACU is open to central banks located in the geographical area of ESCAP and non-ESCAP.

Eligible transactions
All eligible transactions between member countries are required to be cleared through the Asian Clearing Union. The monetary transactions eligible to be settled through the Asian Clearing Union include the following:

 From a resident of one participant to a resident of another participant,
 Related to import and export of goods and services,
 Permitted by the country in which the payer resides,
 Not declared ineligible by the BOD or a participant.

Instruments of Payment
All instruments of payment denominated in AMUs (ACU dollar, ACU euro, and ACU yen), may be used to effect payment through the clearing facility.

Figures
Transactions channeled through the ACU mechanism in 2021 amounted to 29 billion USD.

References
www.asianclearingunion.org

International trade organizations
United Nations organizations based in Asia
Treaties concluded in 1974
Iran and the United Nations